Wilfred Nazareth Menino D'sa is an Indian politician. He was elected to the Goa Legislative Assembly from Nuvem in the 2017 Goa Legislative Assembly election as a member of the Indian National Congress. He was one of the ten members of Indian National Congress who joined Bharatiya Janata Party in July 2019. He is currently an Independent politician.

References

Members of the Goa Legislative Assembly
1967 births
Living people
Former members of Indian National Congress from Goa
People from South Goa district
Goa MLAs 2017–2022
Bharatiya Janata Party politicians from Goa